Anaco is a city in Anzoátegui State, Venezuela, the shire town of Anaco Municipality. It is an industrial town, connected to the natural gas and petroleum industries. Estimated population (as of 2005): 106,275 inhabitants.

Transport
The city is served by Anaco Airport. No longer in service for commercial flights.  Anaco is on the San Tomé-Puerto la Cruz highway that connects the town with San Tomé and El Tigre to the south and Puerto la Cruz on the coast.

Notable people

 Orlando Arcia, Milwaukee Brewers shortstop, younger brother of Oswaldo Arcia
 Oswaldo Arcia, Minnesota Twins outfielder, older brother of Orlando Arcia
 Ruddy Rodríguez - former Miss Venezuela
 Miguel Cairo - Professional baseball player
Dr. Idania Irastorza, - Professor of Pharmacology, UCLA Barquisimeto
 Sammy The Kidd, - Musician, Producer

External links

 http://www.anacoweb.net Website

Cities in Anzoátegui